Yapti Tasba Masraka Nanih Aslatakanka (YATAMA) is an indigenous party mainly active on Nicaragua's Atlantic coast. YATAMA has its roots in the MISURASATA (Miskito, Sumo and Rama Sandinista Alliance) and the MISURA/KISAN organisations. In 1988, in response to the Central American peace accords, the remnants of MISURASATA and MISURA/KISAN in Honduras, Costa Rica and Miami reorganized as YATAMA, united by the traditional Miskitu leaders Steadman Fagoth and Brooklyn Rivera.

YATAMA has participated in several regional elections since 1990. Its best electoral result was in the autonomous elections on the Caribbean Coast in 1990 where they won 26 Regional Council member seats (out of 90). The party was in an alliance with the FSLN from 2006 until 2014.

See also
KISAN

External links
YATAMA - Yapti Tasba Masraka Nanih Aslatakanka (official website, Spanish)
Basic Preliminary Accords between the Government of Nicaragua and the Organization YATAMA

1980s establishments in Nicaragua
1988 establishments in North America
Indigenist political parties in North America
Miskito
Political parties established in 1988
Political parties in Nicaragua
Regionalist parties